Catch for Us the Foxes is the second studio album by the Philadelphia indie rock band mewithoutYou, released on October 15, 2004 by Tooth & Nail Records.

Background
The album takes its name from the Biblical Song of Songs 2:15, "Catch for us the foxes, the little foxes that ruin the vineyards, our vineyards that are in bloom."

Reception
Catch for Us the Foxes reached a peak position of number 20 on the Billboard Top Heatseekers on October 23, 2004.

Track listing
All tracks are written by mewithoutYou.

Personnel 
Personnel per booklet.

mewithoutYou
 Aaron Weiss
 Michael Weiss
 Richard Mazzotta
 Christopher Kleinberg
 Daniel Pishock

Additional musicians
 Scotty Krugercry of the Exodus (track 10)
 Chick Wolvertone-bow (track 12)

Production and design
 Brad Woodproducer, engineer, mixing
 Robbie Lackritzassistant producer, engineer, mixing
 Troy Glessnermastering
 Chad Johnsonartists and repertoire
 Vasily Kadinovcover painting
 Asterisk StudiosDesign

References

MewithoutYou albums
2004 albums
Tooth & Nail Records albums
Albums produced by Brad Wood